Gornji Suhor pri Vinici is a village on the route from Dragatuš to Vinica in the Municipality of Črnomelj in the White Carniola area of southeastern Slovenia. The area is part of the traditional region of Lower Carniola and is now included in the Southeast Slovenia Statistical Region.

Name
The name of the settlement was changed from Gornji Suhor to Gornji Suhor pri Vinici in 1953. In the past the German name was Obersuchor.

Church
The local church is dedicated to Saints Fabian and Sebastian and belongs to the Parish of Vinica. It was first mentioned in written documents dating to 1526, and still has Gothic ribbed vaulting in its sanctuary. The main altar dates to 1658 and was restored in the late 19th century.

References

External links
Gornji Suhor pri Vinici on Geopedia

Populated places in the Municipality of Črnomelj